Triage is the third studio album by Australian band Methyl Ethel. It was released on 15 February 2019 through Dot Dash/4AD Records.

In February 2020, Triage was nominated for the Australian Music Prize of 2019.

Reception

Marcy Donelson from AllMusic said "Triage was produced, performed, and recorded by Jake Webb at his home studio, though its lush, lopsided textures hardly sound like what was a solo effort until the mixing stage. Parts melancholy, trippy, and dancy, he combined programmed and traditional instruments, including his own synth timbres, layering them in ways that sound more like atmospheric arena fare than what was essentially a one-man recording project."

Brad Dountz from Consequence of Sound said "Every song from Methyl Ethel's latest album seems like it is trying to outdo all the others and that is never a bad thing. Triage is probably their best album yet because they only seem to be competing with themselves, which makes for the best form of uncompromising music."

Track listing

Charts

Release history

References

2019 albums
Methyl Ethel albums
4AD albums
Dot Dash Recordings albums